Gary Rosenberg (born New Rochelle, New York, 16 October 1959) is an American malacologist.

Biography
He graduated from Princeton University in 1981 with a bachelor's degree in geology and obtained a Ph.D. in 1989 at Harvard University in the Department of Organismic and Evolutionary Biology. He is currently the Pilsbry Chair and Curator of Malacology at the Academy of Natural Sciences of Philadelphia and a professor at Drexel University in the Department of Biodiversity, Earth and Environmental Science. He is a member of the International Commission on Zoological Nomenclature.

Rosenberg created "Malacolog", an online database of western Atlantic marine mollusks. He also contributed significantly to the "Biotic Database of Indo-Pacific Marine Mollusks" and created an interactive key to the land snails of the West Indian island of Jamaica. More recently he has contributed much work to the worldwide database of marine organisms, WoRMS.

Taxa
Rosenberg has, alone or together with others, described and named various taxa of mollusks, including:
 Lienardia totopotens Rosenberg & Stahlschmidt, 2011
 Lunovula Rosenberg, 1990
 Lunovula finleyi Rosenberg, 1990
 Mitromica calliaqua Rosenberg & Salisbury, 2003
 Mitromica cosmani Rosenberg & Salisbury, 2003
 Mitromica dicksoni Rosenberg & Salisbury, 2003
 Mitromica oryza Rosenberg & Salisbury, 2003
 Mitromica williamsae Rosenberg & Salisbury, 2003
 Prionovolva melonis Rosenberg, 2010
 Thala abelai Rosenberg & Salisbury, 2014
 Thala adamsi Rosenberg & Salisbury, 2003
 Thala evelynae Rosenberg & Salisbury, 2014
 Thala gloriae Rosenberg & Salisbury, 2003
 Thala gorii Rosenberg & Salisbury, 2003
 Thala hilli Rosenberg & Salisbury, 2007
 Thala kilburni Rosenberg & Salisbury, 2014
 Thala lillicoi Rosenberg & Salisbury, 2007
 Thala merrilli Rosenberg & Salisbury, 2014
 Thala pallida Rosenberg & Salisbury, 2014
 Thala ruggeriae Rosenberg & Salisbury, 2014
 Thala suduirauti Rosenberg & Salisbury, 2014
 Thaluta Rosenberg & Callomon, 2004
 Thaluta takenoko Rosenberg & Callomon, 2004
 Trivellona bealsi Rosenberg & Finley, 2001
 Trivia marlowi Rosenberg & Finley, 2001: synonym of Trivellona marlowi (Rosenberg & Finley, 2001)
 Triviella immelmani Rosenberg & Finley, 2001
 Tudivasum Rosenberg & Petit, 1987
 Vertigo marciae Nekola & Rosenberg, 2013
 Vexillum (Costellaria) brunneolinea Rosenberg & Salisbury, 1991
 Vexillum (Costellaria) elliscrossi Rosenberg & Salisbury, 1991: synonym of Vexillum elliscrossi Rosenberg & Salisbury, 1991
 Vexillum elliscrossi Rosenberg & Salisbury, 1991

Publications
Rosenberg has published, alone or in collaboration with others, a great number of publications, including:
 1987: G. Rosenberg & R. E. Petit,  Ryckholt’s Mélanges Paléontologiques, 1851-1862, with a new name for Tudicula H. & A. Adams, non Ryckholt. Proceedings of the Academy of Natural Sciences of Philadelphia 139: 53-64
 1992: G. Rosenberg, An introduction to the Ovulidae (Gastropoda: Cypraeacea). American Conchologist 20:4-7,
 1998: G. Rosenberg, In memoriam Harold Lewis (1927-1998) . American Malacological Union Newsletter 29(1): 6
 1998: G. Rosenberg,  Harold Lewis 1927-1998. La Conchiglia 30(288): 59
 1999: G. Rosenberg, Harold Lewis, 1927-1998. Of Sea and Shore 21(4): 228
 2003: G. Rosenberg & R. E. Petit, Kaicher’s Card Catalogue of World-Wide Shells: a collation, with discussion of species named therein. The Nautilus 117(4): 99-120
 2004: G. Rosenberg, G. and D. Drumm. Interactive Key to Jamaican Land Snails (Rosenberg also specializes in the land snails of Jamaica).
 2006: G. Rosenberg, and I. V. Muratov. Status Report on the Terrestrial Mollusca of Jamaica. Proceedings of the Academy of Natural Sciences of Philadelphia 155: 117-161 
 2006: McClain, C. R., A. G. Boyer and G. Rosenberg. The Island Rule and the evolution of body size in the deep sea. Journal of Biogeography 33: 1578-1584
 2007: G. Rosenberg and R. Salisbury. New species of Thala (Gastropoda: Costellariidae) from Hawaii, with comments on other Indo-Pacific species. Vita Malacologica 5: 53-62
 2008: G. Rosenberg. The land snails. pp. 43–46 in Jamaica: A photographic journey through the land of wood and water. Eladio Fernández: Jamaica 
 2009:  G. Rosenberg, E. F. García and F. Moretzsohn. Gastropods (Mollusca) of the Gulf of Mexico. pp. 579–699 in D. L. Felder and D. K. Camp, eds., The Gulf of Mexico: Origins, Waters and Marine Life. Texas A&M University Press (a much cited work)
 2010: M. A. Snyder, W. G. Lyons & G. Rosenberg, The date of publication of  section 16, corrigenda quaedum et addenda, of Dunker’s Novitates Conchologicae, Series II, Marina mollusca. The Nautilus 124(4): 192-193.
 2010: G. Rosenberg: Description of a new species of Prionovolva (Mollusca, Gastropoda, Ovulidae) from East Africa, with reassessment of the composition of the genus. Proceedings of the Academy of Natural Sciences of Philadelphia 159: 39-66

References
 http://clade.ansp.org/malacology/people/rosenberg/
 Rosenberg, G. 2009. Malacolog 4.1.1: A Database of Western Atlantic Marine Mollusca. [WWW database (version 4.1.1)] URL http://www.malacolog.org/
 http://clade.ansp.org/obis/find_mollusk.html

American malacologists
Harvard University alumni
Scientists from New Rochelle, New York
1959 births
Living people